The Minnesota Valkyrie were a women's American football team that played in the Legends Football League (formerly the Lingerie Football League). Based in Minneapolis, Minnesota, the team played their home games at the Target Center.

On March 23, 2011, it was announced that the Lingerie Football League (LFL) would add an expansion team to Minneapolis for the 2011–12 season. On April 4, 2011, the team was officially named Minnesota Valkyrie. Tony Nguyen was the head coach for the first season. 

The LFL announced that it would suspend operations of the teams in the United States for the 2012–13 season, but returned in the spring of 2013 rebranded as the Legends Football League.  Benson Manento was the head coach in 2013. The team folded in December 2013.

Seasons

2011–12 schedule

2013 schedule

References

External links
 

Legends Football League US teams
Sports in Minneapolis
American football teams in Minneapolis–Saint Paul
American football teams established in 2011
American football teams disestablished in 2013
2011 establishments in Minnesota
2013 disestablishments in Minnesota
Women's sports in Minnesota